Mariusz Zaruski (18 January 1867 – 8 April 1941) was a brigadier-general in the Polish Army, a pioneer of Polish sports yachting, an outstanding climber of the winter and caves of Tatra Mountains. He was a photographer, painter, poet and writer, a seamen and traveler, a conspirator, legionnaire and lancer in Polish cavalry.

During his active life, he was a devoted social activist, sportsman and teacher.

Biography 
Zaruski was born on 18 January 1867 in Dumanowo near the Kamieniec Podolski in Poland. During his youth at Odessa University, where he studied mathematics and physics, he was attracted to maritime activities. He worked as a seaman on various ships. He visited distant regions including Siberia, China, Japan, India, Egypt and Syria.

For his participation in a Polish patriotic anti-Russian organization, the Russian government exiled him to Arkhangelsk in 1894. There, while a prisoner, he was able to graduate from the Seaman School. Conditionally, he was allowed to work on the merchant ship Derzhava. On his first sea journey on the ship, he went to Norway with a log and fur cargo. Later he became captain of the ship Nadezhda.

After finishing his prison term, Zaruski returned to Odessa, where he lived for two years. There he married Izabela Kietlińska. Later, he moved to Kraków, where between 1901 and 1906, he studied painting at the Academy of Fine Arts. In 1907, after graduation, the couple moved to Zakopane for Izabela's health.

For many years, Mariusz Zaruski worked in Zakopane as a mountain guide for tourists and rescues. He organized the Tatra Mountain Rescue Service. In his articles in Polish newspapers, he publicized and popularized the tourism of the Zakopane region. He was the first to climb the Kozi Wierch and Kościelec mountains. Zaruski was also noted for leading a rescue expedition that saved Maria Bandrowski, who was trapped in the Tatra Mountains with her brother, the Polish philosopher Bronisław Bandrowski.

At the start of the First World War, he organized 11th Polish Cavalry Regiment and became its commander. For his bravery during the offensive on Wilno City on 16 April 1919, he was decorated with the highest Polish military distinction, the Order of Virtuti Militari, 5th Class, and several times with the Cross of Valour. He ended up his military career as a brigadier-general and Adjutant to Polish President Stanisław Wojciechowski. He retired before the May Revolt in 1926.

In his retirement, he devoted his time to popularize moral, economic and political benefits of Poland's access to the Baltic Sea. He introduced the Polish elite to the sport of yachting. Through his teaching he attracted countless number of Polish youth to seamanship and yachting.

Together with Antoni Aleksandrowicz, he organized the Yacht Club of Poland. Thanks to his government connections, he was able to acquire for the club the first ocean-going yacht in Poland's history, Witeź. On his initiative, the Sea and River League and the Committee of National Flotilla were established. The committee founded the sailing ship Dar Pomorza. He was an organizer of the Inspectorate of Youth Marine Education. He helped to establish the Marine Terminology Commission, which included representatives from Marine Academy and universities. The Commission edited six volumes of the Polish – English – French – German - Russian Marine Dictionary. In Poland, before the Second World War, the Boy Scouts movement was an important part of marine education among Polish youth.

General Zaruski played a leading role as a seamanship instructor for Polish Scouts units in Jastarnia, located on the shore of the Baltic Sea. He used to say that the hardship of a sailor's duties strengthened the sailor's moral character. In 1935 he became captain of the schooner Zawisza Czarny (ship). At the same time, he was elected President of the Polish Sailing Association. During his presidency, youth at universities, the Boy Scouts and yacht clubs all over Poland were integrated in one mass movement devoted to seamanship and marine education. As captain of Zawisza Czarny, he was treated with such respect and adoration by youths that they called him no other than “Sir General”. His last voyage on Zawisza Czarny was in 1939.

Deliberately, despite the fact that he could leave Poland at the outbreak of the Second World War, he did not abandon his motherland. He was arrested, then imprisoned by the Soviet NKVD in Lwów after the Red Army invaded Poland in September 1939. On 29 March 1941, NKVD sentenced him, as a socially dangerous element, to penal resettlement to Krasnoyarsk Krai in Siberia. He died of cholera in a Soviet prison in Kherson on 8 April 1941.

In autumn of 1991, thanks to the efforts of Związek Harcerstwa Polskiego, the Polish Scouts, the ashes of Gen. Zaruski were brought to Poland and buried in Zakopane Cemetery. He was decorated posthumously by the Polish state with the Grand Cross of Order of Poland’s Rebirth in 1997.

Family
Father Seweryn, mother Eufrozyna, older brother Stanisław, younger brother Bolesław. His devoted wife: Izabella Kietlińska.

Literary legacy
Includes: collection of poems and novels about the Tatra mountains titled Na bezdrożach tatrzańskich (1923) as well as his marine novels titled Wśród wichrów i fal (1935). He expressed his passion for horses in several of his poems.

He gave countless speeches, lectures and published many articles. He wrote several textbooks for sailors and first in Polish history textbook of marine navigation.

Honours and awards
 Silver Cross of the Order of Virtuti Militari,
 Grand Cross of the Order of Polonia Restituta (posthumously in 1997; previously awarded the Commander's Cross and the Officer's Cross
 Cross of Independence
 Cross of Valour (five times)
 Commemorative Medal for War 1918–1921.

See also
 Republic of Zakopane

References

 

1867 births
1941 deaths
People from Khmelnytskyi Oblast
Polish generals
Polish exiles in the Russian Empire
Polish mountain climbers
Polish sailors
Polish Scouts and Guides
19th-century Polish painters
19th-century Polish male artists
20th-century Polish painters
20th-century Polish male artists
20th-century Polish poets
Polish photographers
Grand Crosses of the Order of Polonia Restituta
Recipients of the Silver Cross of the Virtuti Militari
Recipients of the Cross of Independence
Recipients of the Cross of Valour (Poland)
Polish people of the Polish–Soviet War
Polish deportees to Soviet Union
Polish people who died in Soviet detention
Polish people detained by the NKVD
Polish male poets
Polish male painters